Carlos Raúl Contreras Guillén (7 October 1938 – 17 April 2020) was a Chilean football defender who played for Chile in the 1962 FIFA World Cup. He also played for Club Universidad de Chile.

Honors

 Chilean League: (6)
 1959, 1962, 1964, 1965, 1967, 1969
 Tournament Metropolitan: (2)
 1968, 1969
 Cup Francisco Candelori: (1)
 1969

References

External links
FIFA profile

1938 births
2020 deaths
Chilean footballers
Chile international footballers
Association football defenders
Universidad de Chile footballers
1962 FIFA World Cup players
Chilean football managers
Unión La Calera managers
Footballers from Santiago